Magazine is the second studio album by American rock band Heart. It was originally released on April 19, 1977, by Mushroom Records in unfinished form, without the band's permission. A second authorized version of the album was released on April 22, 1978. The album has been certified platinum in both the United States and Canada.

Background
After their debut album, Heart began recording new songs in Vancouver that were intended as their next studio album for Mushroom Records. However, the group had a falling out with Mushroom over an advertisement celebrating the sales of Dreamboat Annie. The advertisement, which ran as a full-page ad in the December 30, 1976 issue of Rolling Stone magazine, was designed to resemble the cover of a salacious tabloid-style magazine (a satire of the National Enquirer), and showed the sisters bare-shouldered (as on the Dreamboat Annie album cover) with the suggestive caption "It Was Only Our First Time!"

Recording sessions for the new album stopped after the band and their label were unsuccessful in re-negotiating their contract. Only five incomplete recordings were made during these 1976 sessions. As Heart had now proven themselves to be hitmakers, they expected Mushroom to raise their royalty rate. However, to the surprise of the group and their producer Mike Flicker, the label refused to pay more.

While keeping the group under contract, Mushroom apparently was not interested in releasing a second Heart album. Flicker then ended his relationship with the label. The contract stipulated that Flicker would be the producer of all Heart recordings. The band took the position that since Mushroom was unable to provide the services of Flicker they would be free to sign with another label. Heart hired a lawyer to resolve the dispute, and they signed with Portrait Records, a subsidiary of CBS Records (now Sony BMG).

Original 1977 release
The change in labels resulted in a prolonged legal battle with Mushroom's creative director Shelly Siegel. Mushroom, which still had a two-album contract, claimed they had the legal right to release a second Heart album after all. Still in possession of the five unfinished studio recordings, as well as unreleased live tracks recorded in 1975, Mushroom had them remixed by the band's recording engineer, but without the presence of any group members.

The label added another studio track, "Here Song" (the B-side to "How Deep It Goes", Heart's first Canadian single from 1975). The rest of the album was filled by two live songs recorded in 1975 at The Aquarius Tavern, a rock club in Seattle where the group had played regularly. Mushroom released the collection as Magazine in the spring of 1977, at the same time that the group was preparing their next album for Portrait, titled Little Queen.

According to Flicker, about 50,000 copies of the original Magazine album were pressed. Some of these copies were sold in stores, mostly in Los Angeles and Hollywood, Florida, where the records were manufactured. Unsold copies were quickly recalled and later destroyed when Heart took Mushroom to court to stop distribution of the album. The 1977 version was also briefly released in Europe through Arista Records, but were ordered off shelves by a second court action.

Though the album was not officially released to radio stations in 1977, some stations such as KISW, a Seattle-based rock station, played songs from the unauthorized version, against the wishes of the group. The 1977 release carried a disclaimer on the back cover that read: 
"Mushroom Records regrets that a contractual dispute has made it necessary to complete this record without the cooperation or endorsement of the group Heart, who have expressly disclaimed artistic involvement in completing this record. We did not feel that a contractual dispute should prevent the public from hearing and enjoying these incredible tunes and recordings."

Injunction, re-recording and remixing
Unhappy with the somewhat unpolished studio performances and the inclusion of the live recordings, the group took Mushroom to court with the aim of having the 1977 release of Magazine withdrawn from the market. The Seattle court ruled that Mushroom had to recall the album, but the terms of the settlement required that Heart provide a second album for Mushroom. Heart chose to fulfill this obligation by finishing the previously released songs to a quality of their satisfaction.

For the 1978 version, Heart chose to re-record, remix and edit the songs and resequence the album. This work was done from March 6 to 9, 1978, at Sea-West Studios in Seattle. The original vocals were probably intended as scratch vocals rather than final takes. Ann Wilson added new lead vocals to most of the existing studio tracks.

One of the most obvious differences is that on the original recording of "Heartless", Ann sings, "The doc said come back again next week..." On the re-recorded version, she sings doctor instead. The new lead vocal on "Heartless" is less controlled than the original. The synthesizer solo on "Just the Wine" was replaced by a flute solo and the song is slightly edited. The ending of "Magazine" fades about 30 seconds earlier. The live "Blues Medley" was edited to remove some of Roger Fisher's guitar solo sections and Ann's solo vocal parts. There are also many other subtle differences. The revised version of the album was released with no disclaimer by Mushroom Records in April 1978.

Epilogue
In the early 1980s, Mushroom Records went out of business. Ownership rights to Heart's two albums for Mushroom were purchased by Capitol Records, which reissued the recordings. The 1978 release was also pressed as a picture disc featuring the album cover. The back cover indicates that it is a special limited edition of 100,000 copies. The original cover had a circle cut out of it. This circle was sent to record stores to be hung in the store for promotion of the album.

"Magazine"
Cash Box said of the title track that "Ann Wilson shines vocally on this lush, engaging ballad, as sister Nancy provides sweet acoustic guitar", and also praised Flicker's production.

Track listing

1977 release

1978 release

Personnel

1977 release
Credits adapted from the liner notes of the 1977 original version of Magazine.

Heart
 Nancy Wilson
 Ann Wilson
 Mike DeRosier
 Howard Leese
 Steve Fossen
 Roger Fisher

Technical
 Rolf Hennemann – production
 Mike Flicker – production, engineering, remix
 Jeff Tolman – remix engineering assistance

Artwork
 Loren Salazar – front cover art
 Burl Davis – art direction
 Glenn Ross – art direction

1978 release
Credits adapted from the liner notes of the 1978 revised version of Magazine.

Heart
 Steve Fossen – bass, vocals
 Michael DeRosier – drums
 Howard Leese – guitars, keyboards, vocals ; guitar solo ; sitar, Avatar ; Mellotron ; string arrangements, string conducting ; back-up vocals 
 Roger Fisher – lead guitar ; guitar solo 
 Nancy Wilson – electric guitar, vocals ; lead guitar ; acoustic guitar ; back-up vocals ; blues harp 
 Ann Wilson – lead vocals ; flute, alto flute ; back-up vocals ; acoustic guitar 

Additional musicians
 Lynn Wilson – back-up vocals 

Technical
 Mike Flicker – production, engineering
 Heart – production assistance
 Mike Fisher – production assistance, special direction
 Rick Keefer – engineering
 Larry Green – engineering assistance
 Terry Gottlieb – engineering assistance
 Rolf Hennemann – engineering assistance
 The Explorer – recording 

Artwork
 Loren Salazar – front cover art

Charts

Weekly charts

Year-end charts

Certifications

Notes

References

Bibliography
 

1977 albums
Albums produced by Mike Flicker
Arista Records albums
Capitol Records albums
Heart (band) albums
Mushroom Records albums
Unauthorized albums